United Nations Security Council resolution 800, adopted without a vote on 8 January 1993, after examining the application of the Slovak Republic for membership in the United Nations, the Council recommended to the General Assembly that Slovakia be admitted.

See also
 Member states of the United Nations
 List of United Nations Security Council Resolutions 701 to 800 (1991–1993)

References

External links
 
Text of the Resolution at undocs.org

 0800
1993 in Slovakia
 0800
 0800
January 1993 events